The Bras d'Isaïe (English: arm of Isaiah) is a tributary of the rivière à Mars, flowing in the unorganized territory of Lac-Ministuk, in the Le Fjord-du-Saguenay Regional County Municipality, in the administrative region of Saguenay–Lac-Saint-Jean, in the province of Quebec, in Canada. The course of the river crosses the eastern part of the zec Mars-Moulin.

A few secondary forest roads serve the valley of the "Bras d'Isaïe", especially for forestry and recreational tourism activities.

Forestry is the main economic activity in this valley; recreational tourism, second.

The surface of the "Bras d'Isaïe" is usually frozen from the beginning of December to the end of March, however the safe circulation on the ice is generally made from mid-December to mid-March.

Geography 
The main watersheds neighboring the "Bras d'Isaïe" are:
 north side: Lorenzo lake, Louis-Philippe-Simard lake, bras des Mouches, rivière à Mars, La Grosse Décharge, La Petite Décharge;
 east side: rivière à Mars, Bras du Coco, Bras Rocheux, Bras d'Hamel;
 south side: rivière à Mars, Jumeau lake, Portage lake, Bras Rocheux;
 west side: rivière du Moulin, La Petite Décharge, Lac Moïse, Bras Henriette, Bras de Jacob Ouest.

The "Bras d'Isaïe" rises at the mouth of "Lac du Bec" which is located in the unorganized territory of Lac-Ministuk. This source is located at:
  west of the rivière à Mars course;
  northeast of the course of the rivière du Moulin;
  south-east of the confluence of the Arm of Isaiah and the Mars river;
  north-east of the course of the Cyriac River;
  south-east of Kenogami Lake.

  to the northwest, crossing a small lake and Lac du Soulier east to its mouth;
  north-east across Lake Isaiah to its mouth ;
  towards the north by forming a curve towards the west, collecting the discharge (coming from the west) of Lévesque Lake and crossing the southern part of Hunter Lake over a hundred meters east to its mouth;
 east to a bend corresponding to a stream (coming from the east);
  northwards, to the arms of the Flies (coming from the north);
  eastwards, to the outlet of Lake Lorenzo (coming from the north-west);
  to the east, to its mouth.

The "Bras d'Isaïe" pours into a bend on the south bank of the Mars river. This confluence is located at:

  west of the Rocky Arm course, a tributary of the Ha! Ha! River;
  west of the hamlet "Ferland" on the west bank of the Arm of Hamel;
  southwest of a curve in the course of the Ha river! Ha!;
  north-east of the hamlet “Secteur-Charlevoix” located on the edge of the Moulin river;
  south of the confluence of the Mars river and the Baie des Ha! Ha!.

From the confluence of the "Bras d'Isaïe" with the Mars river, the current follows the course of the Mars river on  generally towards the north, crosses the Baie des Ha!

Toponymy 
The term "Isaïe" constitutes a biblical character and a first name in French.

The toponym "Bras d'Isaïe" was formalized on June 29, 1983, at the Place Names Bank of the Commission de toponymie du Québec.

See also 

 Le Fjord-du-Saguenay Regional County Municipality
 Lac-Ministuk, an unorganized territory
 Zec de la Rivière-à-Mars, a controlled harvesting zone
 Zec Mars-Moulin, a controlled harvesting zone
 Bras des Mouches
 Rivière à Mars
 Baie des Ha! Ha!
 Saguenay River
 List of rivers of Quebec

References 

Rivers of Saguenay–Lac-Saint-Jean
Le Fjord-du-Saguenay Regional County Municipality